Diary of a Madman is the second studio album by British heavy metal vocalist Ozzy Osbourne. It was released in October 1981, and re-issued on CD on 22 August 1995. This is the last Osbourne studio album to feature guitarist Randy Rhoads and drummer Lee Kerslake. An altered version appeared in 2002 with the original bass and drum parts removed and re-recorded. In 2011, a Deluxe 30th Anniversary Edition was released with all original parts restored. To date, the album has sold over 3 million copies worldwide.

Composition and recording

Diary of a Madman is the final album recorded with late guitarist Randy Rhoads. Although bassist Rudy Sarzo and drummer Tommy Aldridge are credited in the liner notes and pictured on the inner sleeve for the American vinyl and cassette release and later CD re-issues, it was bassist Bob Daisley and drummer Lee Kerslake who performed all bass and drum parts on the original release. Aldridge has stated of the album, "I think it's pretty obvious that it's not my drumming on that album. I have never taken credit for that recording and have always given Lee Kerslake, whenever asked or interviewed, the credit he rightly deserves."

Daisley provided significant contributions to the album's songwriting, having written some of the music and most of the lyrics. Kerslake claims to have also had a hand in the writing of the album, even performing lead vocals on some of the original demo recordings. Flying High Again' was one of my ideas, 'Over the Mountain' was another. The basic (demo) tracks were just Bob's words, my vocals—though some of the words I wrote—and Randy's playing. It was unreal. And then we got Don Airey to come in and do the keyboards", he stated in 2009. Kerslake says he used a piano in the studio to write many of the songs with guitarist Randy Rhoads. Daisley and Kerslake were not given credit for their performance or songwriting contributions, a situation which resulted in a later lawsuit.

During the album's recording, Kerslake says the band members were given no money to live on, prompting them to approach management. Shortly after, both Kerslake and Daisley were fired. "Everything was working fine," said Kerslake. "It was only when Sharon (Osbourne) came in that we had a problem. When she started managing—taking over—she wasn't the manager until Diary of a Madman. Before that was her brother, David. He didn't really want to handle it. He had too much to do for Don (Arden) in the office. So she came in and it started to get edgy. But we never suspected a thing until we went away on holiday. Next minute, they're rehearsing with Tommy Aldridge and Rudy Sarzo, and going to America."

Although Don Airey is credited as keyboardist on the album, it was in fact a musician named Johnny Cook (who had worked with Daisley in Mungo Jerry in the 1970s) who actually recorded the keyboard parts. Airey was on tour as a member of Rainbow at the time of recording and was thus unavailable.

Cover art
The album's cover art features Osbourne's son Louis to his side, with Osbourne himself posing in theatrical make-up.

Reception

Reception of the album has been generally positive. In particular, the neo-classical guitar work of Randy Rhoads has received much praise. Steve Huey of AllMusic stated that "it's not uncommon to find fans who prefer Diary to Blizzard, since it sets an even more mystical, eerie mood, and since Rhoads' playing is progressing to an even higher level". BBC Music referred to the album as "a classic rock record in every way", "lifted out of the ordinary by the legendary rock axe god, Randy Rhoads". Canadian journalist Martin Popoff called Diary of a Madman "a lasting classic that stands as the definitive showcase for Randy Rhoads."

Though the album is regarded quite favorably today, reviews upon its 1981 release were often less than enthusiastic. J. D. Considine of Rolling Stone, for example, opined upon the album's original release that "the songs here are little more than riffs with a vocal line pasted on top" and referred to Rhoads as "a junior-league Eddie Van Halen – bustling with chops but somewhat short on imagination". The magazine, however, would change its tune and later rank the album 15th on its 2017 list of "100 Greatest Metal Albums of All Time".

Re-issues

The 2002 re-issue controversy
The 2002 Diary of a Madman reissue was derided by fans due to the removal of Daisley and Kerslake's original bass and drum tracks. The re-issue featured re-recorded bass and drum tracks contributed by Osbourne's then-bassist and drummer Robert Trujillo and Mike Bordin, respectively. The move was suspected of being retaliatory in nature, as Daisley and Kerslake had successfully sued Osbourne and his wife/manager Sharon in court, winning songwriting credits and royalties for their contributions to Diary of a Madman.

Sharon later stated that Ozzy and not herself was responsible for the decision to re-record the parts, stating "because of Daisley and Kerslake's abusive and unjust behavior, Ozzy wanted to remove them from these recordings. We turned a negative into a positive by adding a fresh sound to the original albums." However, Osbourne contradicted this claim in his 2009 autobiography, stating that the decision to re-record the original bass and drum parts was strictly Sharon's decision, and that "I didn't have anything to do with that decision." He said his wife "just snapped" and had it done without his knowledge. He also stated that "a sticker was put on the covers telling everyone about it", though in fact the sticker was not initially placed on the re-issue and was only placed on the covers at a later date due to fan outcry over the altered recordings.

Deluxe 30th Anniversary Edition
In May 2011, Sony Legacy released its Deluxe 30th Anniversary Editions of Diary of a Madman and Blizzard of Ozz with the original bass and drum tracks restored. These releases also featured bonus tracks and previously unreleased live material featuring guitarist Rhoads – Diary of a Madman features a second CD entitled Ozzy Live, featuring previously-unreleased concert performances from the Blizzard of Ozz 1981 US tour. A box set was also released which included the remastered editions of both albums on CD as well as vinyl, and a DVD documentary entitled Thirty Years After The Blizzard.
Ozzy Live was also separately released as a double 180g vinyl exclusively on Record Store Day 2012.

Track listing

Original release
All songs by Ozzy Osbourne, Randy Rhoads, Bob Daisley and Lee Kerslake, except where noted.

Deluxe edition (2011)
All songs recorded live during the second leg of the Blizzard of Ozz Tour.

'Ozzy Live' 180g vinyl

Disc 2 of the 2011 Legacy Edition of Diary of a Madman was also released as a limited edition standalone double-180g vinyl entitled "Ozzy Live". Sides one, two, and three contained the live material released on the Diary of a Madman Legacy Edition, while side four contained two bonus tracks that had been previously released on the 2011 reissue of Blizzard of Ozz. The vinyl was released exclusively for Record Store Day 2012, and also released as a 7" vinyl reissue of the song "Believer".

Personnel
Ozzy Osbourne – lead & backing vocals, production
Randy Rhoads – guitars, production
Rudy Sarzo – 
Tommy Aldridge – drums, percussion 

Additional Personnel
Don Airey – keyboards (credited on original release but does not appear)
Lindsay Bridgwater – keyboards on 2011 reissue's live disc only
Johnny Cook – keyboards (uncredited)
Louis Clark – string arrangements on "Diary of a Madman"
Robert Trujillo – bass on 2002 reissue
Mike Bordin – drums on 2002 reissue
Rudy Sarzo – credited on original release but does not appear; bass on 2011 reissue's live disc
Tommy Aldridge – credited on original release but does not appear; drums on 2011 reissue's live disc

Production
Max Norman	– producer, engineer
George Marino – mastering
Brian Lee with Bob Ludwig – remastering (1995 reissue)

Charts

Album

Singles

Certifications

References

External links
 

1981 albums
Albums produced by Max Norman
Jet Records albums
Ozzy Osbourne albums
Randy Rhoads